Strauzia verbesinae is a species of tephritid or fruit flies in the genus Strauzia of the family Tephritidae.

References

verbesinae